Clearwater was a provincial electoral district in Alberta, Canada, mandated to return a single member to the Legislative Assembly of Alberta using the first past the post method of voting from 1913 to 1926.

History
The district was controversial because it had only 74 enumerated people when it was created under the 1913 redistribution. It was the smallest district in terms of population in Alberta history. After Joseph State died in 1924, the United Farmers government was facing a possible by-election in the district. The government decided to redistribute the riding and drop the seat from the Assembly. The riding was divided up between Pembina, Lac Ste. Anne and Peace River.

Members of the Legislative Assembly (MLAs)

Election results

1913 general election

1917 general election

1921 general election

See also
Rotten borough
List of Alberta provincial electoral districts

References

Further reading

External links
Elections Alberta
The Legislative Assembly of Alberta

Former provincial electoral districts of Alberta